This is a list of glaciers existing in the United States, currently or in recent centuries. These glaciers are located in nine states, all in the Rocky Mountains or farther west. The southernmost named glacier among them is the Lilliput Glacier in Tulare County, east of the Central Valley of California.

Glaciers of Alaska 

There are approximately 664 named glaciers in Alaska according to the Geographic Names Information System (GNIS).
Agassiz Glacier - Saint Elias Mountains
Aialik Glacier - Kenai Peninsula
Alsek Glacier - Glacier Bay
Aurora Glacier - Glacier Bay
Bacon Glacier
Barnard Glacier 
Bear Glacier - Aialik Peninsula, Resurrection Bay
Bering Glacier 
Black Rapids
Brady Glacier 
Brooks Glacier - Alaska Range
Buckskin Glacier - Alaska Range
Burns Glacier (Alaska) - Kenai Mountains
Byron Glacier - Kenai Mountains
Caldwell Glacier - Alaska Range
Cantwell Glacier - Alaska Range
Carroll Glacier - Glacier Bay
Casement Glacier - Glacier Bay
Castner Glacier - Alaska Range
Charley Glacier - Glacier Bay
Chedotlothna Glacier - Alaska Range
Chenega Glacier - Prince William Sound
Chickamin Glacier (Alaska)
Clark Glacier - Glacier Bay
Columbia Glacier - Prince William Sound
Cul-de-sac Glacier - Kichatna Mountains
Cushing Glacier - Glacier Bay
Dall Glacier - Alaska Range
Davidson Glacier - Lynn Canal
Double Glacier
Eldridge Glacier - Alaska Range
Exit Glacier - Kenai Peninsula
Fairweather Glacier 
Fleischmann Glacier - Kichatna Mountains
Foraker Glacier - Alaska Range
Geikie Glacier - Glacier Bay
Gilman Glacier - Glacier Bay
Godwin Glacier 
Grand Pacific Glacier - Glacier Bay
Grand Plateau Glacier - Glacier Bay
Grewingk Glacier - Kenai Peninsula

Guyot Glacier 
Harding Icefield - Kenai Peninsula
Harvard Glacier - Prince William Sound
Hawkins Glacier 
Herbert Glacier - Juneau Icefield
Herron Glacier - Alaska Range
Holgate Glacier - Kenai Fjords National Park
Hoonah Glacier - Glacier Bay
Hubbard Glacier  - Disenchantment Bay
Hugh Miller Glacier - Glacier Bay
John Glacier - Glacier Bay

Johns Hopkins Glacier - Glacier Bay
Juneau Icefield 
Kadachan Glacier - Glacier Bay
Kahiltna Glacier - Alaska Range
Kanikula Glacier - Alaska Range
Kashoto Glacier - Glacier Bay
Kennicott Glacier 
Klutlan Glacier 
Kuskulana Glacier 
Lacuna Glacier - Alaska Range
Lamplugh Glacier - Glacier Bay
LeConte Glacier 
La Perouse Glacier - Glacier Bay
Lituya Glacier 
Logan Glacier 
Malaspina Glacier 
Margerie Glacier - Glacier Bay
Martin River Glacier 

Matanuska Glacier
McBride Glacier - Glacier Bay
McCall Glacier (Alaska) - Brooks Range, Romanzoff Mountains
McCarty Glacier - Kenai Peninsula/Harding Icefield
Meares Glacier - Prince William Sound

Mendenhall Glacier 
Miles Glacier 
Morse Glacier - Glacier Bay
Muir Glacier - Glacier Bay
Muldrow Glacier - Alaska Range
Nabesna Glacier 
North Crillon Glacier - Glacier Bay
Novatak Glacier
Pedersen Glacier - Kenai Fjords National Park
Peters Glacier (Alaska Range) - Alaska Range
Peters Glacier (Brooks Range) - Brooks Range
Portage Glacier 
Princeton Glacier - Kenai Peninsula
Reid Glacier - Glacier Bay
Rendu Glacier - Glacier Bay
Riggs Glacier - Glacier Bay
Ruth Glacier - Alaska Range
Sargent Icefield - Kenai Peninsula
Scott Glacier
Shadows Glacier - Kichatna Mountains
Shelf Glacier - Kichatna Mountains
 - Prince William Sound
Stikine Icecap 
Straightaway Glacier - Alaska Range
Sunrise Glacier (Alaska) - Alaska Range
Sunset Glacier - Alaska Range
Surprise Glacier (Alaska Range) - Alaska Range
Taku Glacier - Taku River/Juneau Icefield

Tana Glacier 
Tatina Glacier - Kichatna Mountains
Tazlina Glacier
Ted Stevens Ice Field - the northern and eastern half of the Chugach Mountains
Tokositna Glacier - Alaska Range
Topeka Glacier - Glacier Bay
Toyatte Glacier - Glacier Bay
Traleika Glacier - Alaska Range
Tustumena Glacier
Tyeen Glacier - Glacier Bay 
Tyndall Glacier 
Variegated Glacier 
West Fork Glacier (Alaska Range) - Alaska Range
Worthington Glacier
Yahtse Glacier 
Yale Glacier
Yakutat Glacier
Yentna Glacier - Alaska Range

Glaciers of the Pacific Coast Ranges 
The Pacific Coast Ranges include glaciers in the three states on the Pacific Coast.

Washington

There are approximately 186 named glaciers in Washington according to the Geographic Names Information System (GNIS). However, the 1980 eruption of Mount St. Helens eliminated nine of its eleven named glaciers and only the new glacier known as Crater Glacier has been reestablished since.

 Olympic Mountains
 Mount Olympus
Blue Glacier
Hoh Glacier 
Hubert Glacier 
Humes Glacier 
Ice River Glacier
Jeffers Glacier 
White Glacier

 Other peaks in the Olympic Mountains
Anderson Glacier
Cameron Glaciers
Carrie Glacier
Eel Glacier
Fairchild Glacier
Hanging Glacier
Lillian Glacier
Queets Glacier

 North Cascades (non-volcanoes)

Banded Glacier - Mount Logan
Blue Glacier (Chelan County, Washington) - Agnes Mountain
Borealis Glacier
Boston Glacier - Boston Peak
Buckner Glacier
Butterfly Glacier
Cache Col Glacier
Challenger Glacier - Mount Challenger
Chickamin Glacier - Dome Peak
Clark Glacier (Washington)
Colchuck Glacier
Colonial Glacier
Columbia Glacier - Columbia Peak
Company Glacier
Crystal Glacier - Mount Shuksan
Dana Glacier (Washington)
Daniel Glacier - Mount Daniel
Dark Glacier
Davenport Glacier
Depot Glacier - Mount Redoubt
Diobsud Creek Glacier
Dome Glacier
Douglas Glacier (Washington)
East Nooksack Glacier - Mount Shuksan
Eldorado Glacier - Eldorado Peak
Entiat Glacier
Forbidden Glacier
Foss Glacier - Mount Hinman
Fremont Glacier (Washington)
Garden Glacier
Goode Glacier
Grant Glacier (Washington)
Green Lake Glacier
Hanging Glacier (Jefferson County, Washington)
Hanging Glacier (Mount Shuksan) - Mount Shuksan
Hidden Creek Glacier - Hagan Mountain
Hinman Glacier - Mount Hinman
Ice Cliff Glacier
Inspiration Glacier - Eldorado Peak
Isella Glacier
Jerry Glacier
Katsuk Glacier
Kimtah Glacier
Klawatti Glacier
Ladder Creek Glacier
Lewis Glacier (Washington)
Lower Curtis Glacier
Lyall Glacier
Lyman Glacier (North Cascades) 
Lynch Glacier - Mount Daniel
Mary Green Glacier
McAllister Glacier
Mesahchie Glacier
Middle Cascade Glacier
Neve Glacier - Snowfield Peak
Nohokomeen Glacier
Noisy Creek Glacier
North Klawatti Glacier
Overcoat Glacier
Pilz Glacier
Price Glacier (Mount Shuksan) - Mount Shuksan
Queest-alb Glacier or (Three Fingers Glacier)
Quien Sabe Glacier
Redoubt Glacier - Mount Redoubt
Richardson Glacier (Washington)
S Glacier
Sahale Glacier
Sandalee Glacier
Sherpa Glacier
Silver Glacier
Snow Creek Glacier
So-Bahli-Alhi Glacier
South Cascade Glacier
Spider Glacier (Phelps Ridge, Washington)
Spider Glacier (Spider Mountain, Washington)
Spire Glacier
Stuart Glacier
Sulphide Glacier - Mount Shuksan
Table Mountain Glacier
Terror Glacier (Washington)
Thunder Glacier (Skagit County, Washington)
Upper Curtis Glacier - Mount Shuksan
Watson Glacier
West Depot Glacier - Mount Redoubt
West Nooksack Glacier
Whatcom Glacier
White Salmon Glacier (Mount Shuksan) - Mount Shuksan
Wyeth Glacier
Yawning Glacier

 Mount Baker
Bastile Glacier
Boulder Glacier
Coleman Glacier
Deming Glacier (Washington)
Easton Glacier
Hadley Glacier
Mazama Glacier
No Name Glacier
Park Glacier
Rainbow Glacier (Washington)
Roosevelt Glacier
Sholes Glacier
Squak Glacier 
Talum Glaciers
Thunder Glacier (Mount Baker)

 Glacier Peak
Chocolate Glacier
Cool Glacier
Dusty Glacier
Ermine Glacier
Honeycomb Glacier
Kennedy Glacier
Milk Lake Glacier
North Guardian Glacier
Ptarmigan Glacier
Scimitar Glacier
Sitkum Glacier
Suiattle Glacier
Vista Glacier
White Chuck Glacier
White River Glacier

 Mount Rainier

Carbon Glacier 
Cowlitz Glacier
Edmunds Glacier
Emmons Glacier
Flett Glacier
Fryingpan Glacier - Little Tahoma
Ingraham Glacier 
Inter Glacier
Kautz Glacier
Liberty Cap Glacier
Nisqually Glacier
North Mowich Glacier
Ohanapecosh Glacier - Little Tahoma
Paradise Glacier
Pinnacle Glacier (Lewis County, Washington)
Puyallup Glacier
Pyramid Glacier
Russell Glacier
Sarvant Glacier — Cowlitz Chimneys
South Mowich Glacier
South Tahoma Glacier 
Success Glacier
Tahoma Glacier
Unicorn Glacier (Extinct)
Van Trump Glacier 
Wilson Glacier
Whitman Glacier - Little Tahoma
Williwakas Glacier
Winthrop Glacier

 Goat Rocks
Conrad Glacier
McCall Glacier
Meade Glacier
Packwood Glacier

 Mount Adams
Adams Glacier
Avalanche Glacier
Crescent Glacier
Gotchen Glacier
Klickitat Glacier
Lava Glacier
Lyman Glacier 
Mazama Glacier
Pinnacle Glacier 
Rusk Glacier
Wilson Glacier
White Salmon Glacier

 Mount St. Helens 
Mount St. Helens once had eleven named glaciers, but the 1980 eruption of the volcano eliminated nine glaciers and the two remaining aren't recognized. One newly formed glacier now resides in the caldera of the volcano.
Crater Glacier
Shoestring Glacier

Oregon
There are 35 named glaciers in Oregon according to the Geographic Names Information System (GNIS).
 Wallowa Mountains
Benson Glacier - Eagle Cap

 Mount Hood 

Coe Glacier
Coalman Glacier
Eliot Glacier
Glisan Glacier
Ladd Glacier
Langille Glacier
Newton Clark Glacier
Palmer Glacier
Reid Glacier
Sandy Glacier
White River Glacier
Zigzag Glacier

 Mount Jefferson
Jefferson Park Glacier
Milk Creek Glacier
Russell Glacier
Waldo Glacier
Whitewater Glacier

 Three Sisters Region
Bend Glacier - Broken Top
Carver Glacier - South Sister
Clark Glacier - South Sister
Collier Glacier - North & Middle Sisters
Crook Glacier - Broken Top
Diller Glacier - Middle Sister
Eugene Glacier - South Sister
Hayden Glacier - Middle Sister
Irving Glacier - Middle Sister
Lewis Glacier - South Sister
Linn Glacier - North Sister
Lost Creek Glacier - South Sister
Prouty Glacier - South Sister
Renfrew Glacier - Middle Sister
Skinner Glacier - South Sister
Thayer Glacier - North Sister
Villard Glacier - North Sister

 Other Cascade Peaks
Lathrop Glacier - Mount Thielsen

California 
There are 20 named glaciers in California according to the Geographic Names Information System (GNIS).
 Mount Shasta 
Mount Shasta is a volcano with seven named glaciers in the northern region of California.
Bolam Glacier 
Hotlum Glacier 
Konwakiton Glacier 
Mud Creek Glacier 
Watkins Glacier
Whitney Glacier 
Wintun Glacier

 Sierra Nevada
Conness Glacier - Mount Conness 
Dana Glacier - Mount Dana
Darwin Glacier - Mount Darwin
Goethe Glacier - Mount Goethe
Lilliput Glacier - Mount Stewart - southernmost glacier in the United States
Lyell Glacier - Mount Lyell
Maclure Glacier - Mount Maclure 
Matthes Glaciers
Mendel Glacier - Mount Mendel 
Middle Palisade Glacier - Middle Palisade 
Mount Fiske Glacier - Mount Fiske
Mount Warlow Glacier - Mount Warlow
Norman Clyde Glacier - Norman Clyde Peak
Palisade Glacier - North Palisade
Powell Glacier - Mount Powell

Glaciers of Nevada (in the Basin and Range Province) 

Basin and Range Province lies east of the Coast Ranges and west of the Rockies. There are no active glaciers in the Basin and Range Province and Wheeler Peak Glacier is considered by some to be a rock glacier.
 Wheeler Peak Glacier - Great Basin National Park

Glaciers of the Rocky Mountains

Colorado

According to the Geographic Names Information System (GNIS), there are sixteen named glaciers in Colorado. 
According to early mountain explorers and scientists, Colorado once had more than eighteen glaciers before 1880.
Andrews Glacier - Andrews Pass 
Arapaho Glacier - between North Arapaho and South Arapaho Peaks 
Arikaree Glacier - Between Arikaree Peak and Navajo Peak
Blanca Glaciers - two extinct glaciers (N.& S. glacier) on Mt. Blanca.  These glaciers were located at 37° 35N., longitude 105° 28W. at 12,000 feet in the Sangre de Cristo Mountain Range.
Fair Glacier - Apache Peak 
Isabelle Glacier - Shoshone Peak 
Mills Glacier - Longs Peak, Rocky Mountain National Park 
Moomaw Glacier 
Navajo Glacier - North slope of Navajo Peak
Peck Glacier 
Rowe Glacier 
Saint Mary's Glacier 
Saint Vrain Glaciers
Sprague Glacier
Taylor Glacier
The Dove - north of Longs Peak 
Tyndall Glacier
See also Glaciers of Colorado
See also

Montana

According to the Geographic Names Information System (GNIS), there are 60 named glaciers in Montana.
Agassiz Glacier - Glacier National Park (U.S.)
Ahern Glacier - Glacier National Park
Baby Glacier - Glacier National Park
Beartooth Glacier - Beartooth Mountains
Blackfoot Glacier - Glacier National Park
Blackwell Glacier - Cabinet Mountains
Boulder Glacier (Montana) - Glacier National Park
Carter Glaciers - Glacier National Park
Castle Rock Glacier - Beartooth Mountains
Chaney Glacier - Glacier National Park
Dixon Glacier - Glacier National Park
Fissure Glacier - Mission Mountains
Gem Glacier - Glacier National Park
Granite Glacier - Beartooth Mountains
Grant Glacier - Flathead National Forest
Grasshopper Glacier - Beartooth Mountains
Gray Wolf Glacier - Mission Mountains
Grinnell Glacier - Glacier National Park
Harris Glacier - Glacier National Park
Harrison Glacier - Glacier National Park
Herbst Glacier - Glacier National Park
Hidden Glacier - Beartooth Mountains
Hopper Glacier - Beartooth Mountains
Hudson Glacier - Glacier National Park
Ipasha Glacier - Glacier National Park
Jackson Glacier - Glacier National Park
Kintla Glacier - Glacier National Park
Logan Glacier - Glacier National Park
Lupfer Glacier - Glacier National Park
McDonald Glacier - Mission Mountains
Miche Wabun Glacier - Glacier National Park
Mountaineer Glacier - Mission Mountains
North Swiftcurrent Glacier - Glacier National Park
Old Sun Glacier - Glacier National Park
Phantom Glacier - Beartooth Mountains
Piegan Glacier - Glacier National Park
Pumpelly Glacier - Glacier National Park
Pumpkin Glacier - Glacier National Park
Rainbow Glacier - Glacier National Park
Red Eagle Glacier - Glacier National Park
Sexton Glacier - Glacier National Park
Shepard Glacier - Glacier National Park
Siyeh Glacier - Glacier National Park
Sky Top Glacier - Beartooth Mountains
Snowbank Glacier - Beartooth Mountains
Sperry Glacier - Glacier National Park
Stanton Glacier - Flathead National Forest
Sundance Glacier - Beartooth Mountains
Sunrise Glacier - Mission Mountains
Swan Glaciers - Swan Range
Swiftcurrent Glacier - Glacier National Park
The Salamander Glacier - Glacier National Park
Thunderbird Glacier - Glacier National Park
Two Ocean Glacier - Glacier National Park
Vulture Glacier (Montana) - Glacier National Park
Weasel Collar Glacier - Glacier National Park
Whitecrow Glacier - Glacier National Park
Wolf Glacier - Beartooth Mountains

Utah
There are no visible glaciers in Utah. Timpanogos Glacier article is documentation of a buried glacier.
Timpanogos Glacier - Wasatch Range

Wyoming

According to the Geographic Names Information System (GNIS), there are 37 named glaciers in Wyoming.
American Legion Glacier - Wind River Range
Baby Glacier - Wind River Range
Bull Lake Glacier - Wind River Range
Cloud Peak Glacier - Bighorn Mountains
Connie Glacier - Wind River Range
Continental Glacier - Wind River Range
Dinwoody Glacier - Wind River Range
Downs Glacier - Wind River Range
Dry Creek Glacier - Wind River Range
DuNoir Glacier - Absaroka Mountains
East Torrey Glacier - Wind River Range
Falling Ice Glacier - Teton Range
Fishhawk Glacier - Absaroka Mountains
Gannett Glacier - Wind River Range
Gooseneck Glacier - Wind River Range
Grasshopper Glacier - Wind River Range
Harrower Glacier - Wind River Range
Heap Steep Glacier - Wind River Range
Helen Glacier - Wind River Range
Hooker Glacier - Wind River Range
J Glacier - Wind River Range
Klondike Glacier - Wind River Range

Knife Point Glacier - Wind River Range
Lander Glacier - Wind River Range
Lizard Head Glacier - Wind River Range
Lower Fremont Glacier - Wind River Range
Mammoth Glacier - Wind River Range
Middle Teton Glacier - Teton Range
Minor Glacier - Wind River Range
Petersen Glacier - Teton Range
Sacagawea Glacier - Wind River Range
Schoolroom Glacier - Teton Range
Skillet Glacier - Teton Range
Sourdough Glacier - Wind River Range
Sphinx Glacier - Wind River Range
Stroud Glacier - Wind River Range
Teepe Glacier - Teton Range
Teton Glacier - Teton Range
Tiny Glacier - Wind River Range
Triple Glaciers - Teton Range
Twins Glacier - Wind River Range
Upper Fremont Glacier - Wind River Range
Washakie Glacier - Wind River Range
Wind River Glacier - Wind River Range

See also
List of glaciers
List of Mount Hood glaciers
List of glaciers in Wyoming

Notes 
Reported in 2020 to have disappeared.

References

United States
Glacier